Hexes & Ohs is a Canadian electronic indie pop group from Montreal. Their sound combines 1980s inspired beats and synthesizer sounds with indie pop structures and melodies. They have released three albums since 2005 and have opened for many artists such as Tokyo Police Club, Sloan, and Mates of State. The two members of Hexes and Ohs consist of Edmund Lam and Heidi Donnelly, who were high-school sweethearts who experimented and created their own musical sound.

History
Donnelly and Lam's first musical endeavour was a pop quartet called Jolly Bean.  While with this band they recorded two albums and through the 90’s transformed from an East Coast pop style to a more electric sound. Jolly Bean experimented with different styles of music included pop, grunge, and electronic.

Jolly Bean was changed into a trio called "A Vertical Mosaic" in 1999.  The band was soon signed by a Canadian record company called Noise Factory Records and continued to record songs.  A Vertical Mosaic built up a fan base in the band’s city or origin, Montreal.  A Vertical Mosaic disbanded in 2004 due to disagreements between the members.

Donnelly and Lam then created the duo Hexes & Ohs shortly after A Vertical Mosaic was disbanded.   In 2005 they released their debut album Goodbye Friend, Welcome Lover which consisted of songs recorded from their apartment. The album contained a combination of vocals, guitars, and synthesizer; it placed in the top ten on the Canadian campus and community radio charts in June that year.   CBC Radio 3 named "Whadaya Know?" one of their top 50 singles of the year.

Donnelly and Lam have opened for Mates of State, Sloan, Aurevoir Simone, Tokyo Police Club, and Pony up! Heidi and Edmund have also performed at Pop Montreal, Canadian Music Week, North by Northeast, Halifax Pop Explosion, Ladyfest, and the CBC Radio 3 national tour.
 
As a side project Edmund Lam has also played acoustic guitar with a band called "You and Me", a band which specializes in vocal harmonies and classical accompaniments.

Heidi and Edmund married in Montreal on July 31, 2010.

Discography
Albums:
Goodbye Friend, Welcome Lover – Noise Factory Records, May 2005
Motion K’Motion EP – Self Released Limited Edition Tour, August 2006
Bedroom Madness – Noise Factory Records, September 2008
Thank You – Lazy At Work, May 2012

Compilations:
Up.Remixed- Upstairs Recordings, 2008
Fear of A Digital Planet-Vinyl Republik, 2006
Québec Émergent 2006
Ladyfest Ottawa Sampler- Basement Attic Records, 2005
Noise Factory Sampler No.2- Noise Factory Records, 2005
Suburban Rebels-Duotone Records, 2004

References

External links

Hexes and Ohs at Noise Factory Records
edmundlam.com
theyouandmeband.com

Musical groups established in 2004
Musical groups from Montreal
Canadian indie pop groups
Canadian electronic music groups
Electronic music duos
English-language musical groups from Quebec
Canadian musical duos